Aftiphilin is a protein that in humans is encoded by the AFTPH gene.

Aftiphilin forms a stable complex with p200 and synergin gamma. The protein contains a clathrin box, with two identified clathrin-binding motifs, and is involved in vesicle-trafficking. The protein is found in many eukaryotes.

References

External links

Further reading